Roberta Foster is a Barbadian dressage rider. She competed at the 2019 Pan American Games in Lima where she became 11th in the finals. She competed also at the 1999 Pan American Games and is the most successful dressage rider from Barbados in history, by being the first Grand Prix rider for Barbados.

She is also chair member of the dressage department at the Barbados Equestrian Federation. In 2019 they organized for the first time in history an international equestrian show in St. Philip, which she won all classes.

References 

Living people
Barbadian dressage riders
People from Christ Church, Barbados
1961 births
Equestrians at the 2019 Pan American Games
Equestrians at the 1999 Pan American Games
Female equestrians
Pan American Games competitors for Barbados